Joinville may refer to:

Places
 Joinville, Santa Catarina, Brazil
 Joinville, Haute-Marne, a commune in Haute-Marne, France
 Joinville-le-Pont, a commune in the southeastern suburbs of Paris, France
Joinville Islands, an Antarctic archipelago
Joinville Island, the largest island in that archipelago

People
 François d'Orléans, Prince of Joinville (1818-1900), the third son of French king Louis Philippe I
 Princess Francisca of Brazil, princess of Joinville 
 Giany Joinville (born 1984), a French professional football player
 Guillaume de Joinville (died 1226), a French archbishop of Reims
 Jean de Joinville (1225-1317), one of the great chroniclers of medieval France

Other
 Joinville Esporte Clube, Brazilian football team
 Joinville Studios, French film studios located in Paris

See also